Natalia Naumoff (born 27 February 1990) is a Macedonian footballer who plays as a defender. She has been a member of the North Macedonia women's national team.

References

1990 births
Living people
Women's association football defenders
Macedonian women's footballers
North Macedonia women's international footballers
Macedonian expatriate footballers
Macedonian expatriate sportspeople in Slovenia
Expatriate women's footballers in Slovenia
ŽNK Mura players